

Kübassaare Lighthouse (Estonian: Kübassaare tuletorn) is a lighthouse located in Kübassaare Peninsula, in the easternmost point of Saaremaa; in Estonia. The lighthouse is 18 metres in height, a round cylindrical concrete tower with a lantern and gallery. The current lighthouse had a height of 11 metres, before it was extended to 18 metres in 1939. The lighthouse has a glare configuration of: 2.5 s glare, 6.5 s off.

See also 

 List of lighthouses in Estonia

References

External links 

 

Lighthouses completed in 1939
Resort architecture in Estonia
Lighthouses in Estonia
Saaremaa Parish
Buildings and structures in Saaremaa